James Fergusson may refer to:

Politics
Sir James Fergusson, 6th Baronet (1832–1907), Governor of South Australia, New Zealand and Bombay
Sir James Fergusson, 8th Baronet (1904–1973), Lord Lieutenant of Ayrshire
Sir James Fergusson, Lord Kilkerran (1688–1759), Scottish politician and judge

Military
Sir James Fergusson (British Army officer) (1787–1865), Governor of Gibraltar, 1855–1859
Sir James Fergusson (Royal Navy officer) (1871–1942), British admiral

Others
Sir James Fergusson, 4th Baronet (1765–1838), see Dalrymple baronets
James Fergusson (architect) (1808–1886), Scottish architect and writer
James Fergusson (author), (1966-) British journalist and author
James Fergusson (judge) (1769–1842), Scottish judge and legal writer

See also
James Ferguson (disambiguation)
Fergusson (disambiguation)